"Don't Wanna Cry" (Korean: 울고 싶지 않아) is a song released by South Korean boy band Seventeen on May 22, 2017, as the lead single from their EP Al1.

Lyrics and composition 
"Don't Wanna Cry" is a major departure from the group's previous singles, which consisted mainly of lighthearted, upbeat love songs. The lyrics describe post-breakup feelings of heartbreak and loneliness. Additionally, it incorporated elements of EDM and electropop and was less influenced by hip hop than their previous work.

Music video 
The music video for "Don't Wanna Cry" was released on May 22.

Reception and plagiarism controversy 
"Don't Wanna Cry" was praised by critics as a transition to a more mature sound for the group. It won Best Dance Performance for a male group at the 2017 Mnet Asian Music Awards and reached number one on the Korea Hot music chart. Due to plagiarism concerns and criticism about the song's similarity to "Something Just Like This", Seventeen gave Coldplay and the Chainsmokers copyright credit, although Pledis Entertainment, Seventeen's record label, maintains the song was "independently created" and the move was to protect the artists from potential legal issues.

Charts

Certifications

References 

2017 songs
2017 singles
K-pop songs
South Korean songs
Songs involved in plagiarism controversies
Hybe Corporation singles